Wang Lin (6 May 1952 – 10 February 2017) was allegedly a Chinese qigong master. He first became famous for qigong in the 1990s. He may have met Jackie Chan, Jet Li, Suharto,   Zhao Wei, Faye Wong, Jack Ma and other famous person. After being exposed by the Beijing News in July 2013, he became more famous in China. He fled to Hong Kong and he said he was "China's Snowden".

He was purportedly the richest man in Pingxiang and built the residence "Wang palace" (王府).

Career
Wang left home at seven years old and studied in Mount Emei. After his studies he was sent to the countryside due to the Cultural Revolution. Later he was sent to prison charged with "destroying agriculture". After the Cultural Revolution, he was released from prison and then opened his own business in Shenzhen until he received a Hong Kong permanent resident identity card.

Fame
Beijing News published the article "The Money kingdom of Wang Lin" on July 22, 2013, making Wang Lin a well-known person on the internet and simultaneously causing Chinese people to question whether his income was illegal. Wang fled to Hong Kong.

Criminal charge
Wang Lin was charged  with seven criminal offenses:
Illegal medicine practice
Bigamy
Fraud
Tax evasion
Bribery
Gambling
Illegal possession of firearms

References

1952 births
2017 deaths
21st-century Hong Kong people
Qigong practitioners